The 1977–78 season was Clydebank's twelfth season after being elected to the Scottish Football League. They finished bottom of the table in the Scottish Premier Division with only six wins and seven draws and returned to Division One the following season. They also competed in the Scottish League Cup and Scottish Cup and for the second season running, the Anglo-Scottish Cup.

Results

Division 1

Final League table

Scottish League Cup

Scottish Cup

Anglo-Scottish Cup

References

Sources
Clydebank FC website

Clydebank
Clydebank F.C. (1965) seasons